George Clarence "Bugs" Moran (Adelard Leo Cunin; August 21, 1893 – February 25, 1957) was an American Chicago Prohibition-era gangster. He was incarcerated three times before his 21st birthday. Seven members of his gang were gunned down and killed in a warehouse in the Saint Valentine's Day Massacre of February 14, 1929, supposedly on the orders of his rival Al Capone.

Early life and career
Moran was born Adelard Cunin to a French immigrant father, Jules Adelard Cunin, and a mother of Canadian descent, Marie Diana Gobeil, in Saint Paul, Minnesota. He attended Cretin High School, a private Catholic school in Saint Paul, but he also joined a local juvenile gang and left school at age 18. He was later caught robbing a store and was sent to the state juvenile correctional facility, and was put in jail three times before he turned 21. He then fled to Chicago where he was caught trying to rob a warehouse, taking part in a horse-stealing ring, taking part in robbery involving the death of a police officer, and robbing a freight car, for which he received a variety of prison and jail sentences.

Prohibition
Prohibition was established in 1920 with the enactment of the 18th Amendment, which banned the distribution of alcoholic beverages, resulting in bootlegging. Among the involved gangs were Dean O'Banion and his mostly Irish group, including Bugs Moran, who became known as the North Side Gang and Al Capone as the leader of the Italian mob on the South Side. These two rivals fought violently, resulting in what is known as "The Bootleg Battle of the Marne".

Battling Al Capone
The bootlegging operation of Hymie Weiss and Bugs Moran continued to pose a significant challenge to Capone's South Side Gang. Moran and Capone then led a turf war with each other that cost them both. Moran's hatred of Capone was apparent even to the public. Moran was disgusted that Capone engaged in prostitution. He would not increase profits himself by engaging in prostitution rings because of his Catholic religion. Johnny Torrio's gang killed Dean O'Banion, and in an attempt to avenge him, Bugs Moran and Earl "Hymie" Weiss made an attempt on Torrio's life. Later they went on to make a failed attempt on Al Capone's life at his headquarters, the Hawthorne Inn in Cicero, Illinois. More than one thousand shots were fired at the inn and at a nearby restaurant in their attempts to kill Capone. In retaliation, Weiss was killed by Capone's gang, and Moran became the new boss of the North Side Gang.

According to historian of Twin Cities organized crime Paul Maccabee, Bugs Moran had a close friendship with St. Paul-based Irish mob boss Danny Hogan. Following Hogan's murder by car bomb on December 4, 1928, Bugs Moran personally stood guard outside the Hogan family residence at West Seventh Street in St. Paul, "apparently to protect the Hogan family from further underworld attacks."

Responding to Weiss's death, Moran tried to kill a member of Capone's gang, resulting in an attack, allegedly from Capone, known as the St. Valentine's Day Massacre.

The St. Valentine's Day Massacre

On February 14, 1929, seven members of Moran's gang died in the Saint Valentine's Day Massacre. Moran was offered a truckload of whiskey at a bargain price, which he had ordered to be delivered at 10:30 a.m. to the garage of the S.M.C. Cartage Company on North Clark Street, where he kept his bootlegging trucks. 

Two gunmen -- dressed as Chicago police officers and two others in plain clothes -- lined up Moran's people against the wall in the warehouse and shot them. Bugs Moran, the main target of the "assassination" was not present, having arrived late and saw the approaching Police car he turned around going to a nearby café instead. Another North Sider, Al Weinshank, was misidentified as Moran by one of the lookouts who signaled for the attack to begin.

Police response was delayed when witnesses saw the two "police officers" exit the scene. There were six corpses and another man near death when police arrived on the scene. The man, Frank Gusenberg, following the gangster's code of silence, refused to identify the killers before dying. When Moran learned of the carnage, he broke the gangster code, accusing Capone of the murders. No one was convicted, Capone denying involvement in the massacre, though twice being summoned to court, which he avoided by claimed illness.

There is some evidence implicating Chicago police officers in the killings. Prior to the massacre, some officers were stealing bootleg liquor from the gang's trucks and were allegedly disciplined by the chief of police, but no substantiation is available. It has been established that Al Capone was in Florida on the day of the massacre.

After Prohibition
Moran managed to keep control of his territory and what remained of his gang through the early 1930s, but the North Side gang never fully recovered its power or former place in Chicago's underworld as the chief rival to Capone's Italian mob. Moran eventually left the area, quitting the gang entirely—though not the criminal lifestyle.  He reverted to his earlier gangster ways of petty crime such as mail fraud and robbery.

On April 30, 1939, Moran was convicted of conspiracy to cash $62,000 worth of American Express checks. He was freed on appeal when he posted a bond; he fled but was captured and not released until December 21, 1944. He was almost penniless by the 1940s, only 17 years after being one of the richest gangsters in Chicago. On July 6, 1946, he was arrested for his involvement in the robbery of a Dayton, Ohio tavern on June 28, 1945, and he received a sentence of 20 years after being found guilty. He was paroled in 1956, but was immediately arrested for his role in the 1945 robbery of a bank in Ansonia, Ohio. He was found guilty in 1957 and sentenced to 10 more years in prison.

Death in prison
Moran died of lung cancer a few months into his 10-year sentence at Leavenworth Federal Prison in Kansas on February 25, 1957, at the age of 63.

Personal life
Moran married Lucille Logan Bilezikdian, with whom he had a son, John George Moran, who left him because of his criminal lifestyle. In 1922, he married Evelyn Herrell. (No known photographs of Evelyn exist.)

In popular culture

References

Sources
Bugs Moran at Encyclopædia Britannica
George "Bugs" Moran, head-and-shoulders portrait, facing left. 1957. New York World-Telegram and the Sun Newspaper Photograph Collection, whereabouts unknown. 	Accessed 22 Mar. 2015. https://www.loc.gov/pictures/item/95511458/
George "Bugs" Moran, head-and-shoulders portrait, facing front. 1930. Library of Congress, whereabouts unknown. Accessed 22 Mar. 2015. 	https://www.loc.gov/pictures/item/93511625/
"FEB 14 1929: The St Valentine's Day Massacre in Chicago". History Today 59, no. 2 (February 2009): 10. Corporate ResourceNet, Accessed March 23, 2015. EBSCOhost.
Salem Press. American Villains. Pasadena, Calif: Salem Press, 2008. 386–389. Accessed March 22, 2015. EBSCOhost.

External links

George Clarence Moran at My Al Capone Museum

1893 births
1957 deaths
American bank robbers
American crime bosses
American people of French descent
American people of Canadian descent
American people who died in prison custody
American bootleggers
Deaths from cancer in Kansas
Deaths from lung cancer
North Side Gang
People from Chicago
People from Saint Paul, Minnesota
Prisoners who died in United States federal government detention
Prohibition-era gangsters
Prohibition gangs
es:Bugs Moran